Nithyakalyana Perumal Temple is one of the three famous temple in the port city of Karaikal, Puducherry, India. It is nearby the Karaikal Ammayar Temple. The temple tank of Chandra Theertham separates the two temples. The temple tank belongs to both the temples. The Nithyakalyana Perumal temple is located on the Bharathiar Street of Karaikal.

Deities inside the temple
The temple is a Vishnu temple with the idol of Vishnu in a lying posture named Nithyakalyana Perumal.He is the main god of the temple. Nithyakalyana Perumal sanctum is present in the temple. In the praghara, there are many sanctums for the gods:
Chakkarathazhwar
Ranganayaghi Thayar
Narasimha avatar of Lord Vishnu
Hanuman
Avatars of Lord Vishnu
Lord Krishna's Vishwaroopam
Lord Garuda
Aandal
Alamelu Thayaar

Functions celebrated
The festivals related to Vishnu and his avatars are celebrated in a grand manner in this temple. The Rama Navami, Vaikunda Ekadesi, Hanuman Jayanti and the entire month of Margazhi are celebrated here. During the Tamil month of Poorattadhi or Puratasi, many rituals take place in the temple such as the Pavithra pradhistai, Kumba poojai, Poornahoothi, and Chakarathazwar Aavahanam.

References

Hindu temples in Puducherry